Abbas Asgari is an Iranian Football forward who currently plays for Iranian football club  Naft Masjed Soleyman in the Azadegan League.

References

Iranian footballers
1990 births
Living people
People from Masjed Soleyman
Naft Masjed Soleyman F.C. players
Azadegan League players
Association football forwards
Sportspeople from Khuzestan province